El Entag El Harby Sporting Club, sometimes referred to as Military Production, is an Egyptian sports club based in Cairo, Egypt. The club is mainly known for its football team, which currently plays in the Egyptian Premier League, the highest league in the Egyptian football league system. The club is owned by the Egyptian Ministry of Military Production.

Founded in 2004, the club managed to reach the Egyptian Premier League for the first time in their history in 2009 after they were promoted from the 2008–09 Egyptian Second Division by finishing first in their group.

History
After a long and an intense race with Al Nasr and El Dakhleya in 2008–09, El Entag El Harby secured its first appearance ever in the Egyptian Premier League. The team needed their last match that season (2–2 tie with GASCO) to win promotion. In preparation for its premier league campaign, El Entag El Harby appointed Tarek Yehia as the new manager. Yehia quickly looked for the option of signing experienced Egyptian players that could lead the team to prevent relegation. He signed players such as Mohamed Aboul Ela (Zamalek former captain), Mostafa Kamal (Veteran Goal Keeper), Hassan Mousa, and others.

Tarek Yehia enjoyed great success with his team. Surprisingly, El Entag El Harby finished 7th in its first season at the Premier League level (2009–10). However, Yehia's era at the club lasted for only that season. He preferred to move to newly promoted Misr Lel Makasa. Osama Orabi replaced him.

Players

Current squad

Out on loan

Managers
 Tarek Yehia (May 5, 2009 – June 6, 2010)
 Osama Oraby (July 1, 2010 – July 13, 2011)
 Mohamed Helmy (Jan 8, 2011 – June 25, 2012)
 Osama Oraby (July 3, 2012 – April 24, 2013)
 Ismail Youssef (April 24, 2013 – 2014)
 Mo'men Soliman (March 3, 2015 – July 22, 2015)
 Shawky Gharieb (2015 – 20 March 2017)
 Mokhtar Mokhtar (2017 – 2021)
 Ahmed Abdel Moneim (2021 – )

References

Football clubs in Cairo
Multi-sport clubs in Egypt
2004 establishments in Egypt
Military association football clubs